Araura may refer to:
 Aitutaki, an island in the Cook Islands for which Araura is a traditional name 
 Araura College, the island's college